Alex Ruff  (born 1974) is a Canadian politician who was elected to represent the riding of Bruce—Grey—Owen Sound in the House of Commons of Canada in the 2019 federal election and re-elected in the 2021 Canadian federal election. He is a retired Colonel in the Canadian Armed Forces (CAF).

Background and education

Ruff grew up on a farm just outside of Tara, ON the eldest of five boys. He attended Arran-Tara Elementary School and Chesley District High School. Ruff graduated from the Royal Military College of Canada in 1997 with an Honours degree in space science.

Military career

As an infantry officer within The Royal Canadian Regiment and throughout his 25-year career, Ruff was posted to Garrison Petawawa, Kingston, CFB Gagetown, Canadian Forces College in Toronto, and to Canadian Special Operations Forces Command headquarters and Canadian Joint Operations Command both of which are in Ottawa. He had six operational deployments: Operation Recuperation (ice storm in eastern Ontario/western Quebec, 1998), twice as part of the Stabilisation Force in Bosnia and Herzegovina - Operation Palladium (Bosnia, 1998–99 and 2001), twice on Operation Athena (Kandahar, Afghanistan in 2007 and Kabul, Afghanistan in 2012) and most recently as part of Combined Joint Task Force – Operation Inherent Resolve (Baghdad, Iraq in 2018-19). He retired from the CAF in early 2019.

Federal politics

In April 2019, Ruff won the Conservative nomination for the riding of Bruce—Grey—Owen Sound for the 2019 federal election following the retirement of Larry Miller. He was elected as a Member of Parliament on October 21, 2019. He was a member of the Standing Committee on Veterans Affairs from February to August 2020. On September 02, 2020, he was appointed to the Conservative Party House Leadership team by Erin O’Toole as the Deputy Opposition Whip. He served in this role until November 2021. On September 20, 2021, he was re-elected as the MP for Bruce-Grey-Owen Sound. Since December 9, 2021, he sits on the Standing Committee on Human Resources, Skills and Social Development and the Status of Persons with Disabilities (HUMA) and since December 13, 2021 he has been an member on the Special Committee on Afghanistan (AFGH).

Electoral record

References

External links
 

Living people
Conservative Party of Canada MPs
Members of the House of Commons of Canada from Ontario
Year of birth uncertain
Royal Military College of Canada alumni
Canadian military personnel from Ontario
1974 births
People from Bruce County
Royal Canadian Regiment officers